Vesela Dolyna is a village in Horlivka Raion, Donetsk Oblast (province) of Ukraine. It was previously located in Bakhmut Raion.

Demographics
Native language as of the Ukrainian Census of 2001:
 Ukrainian 20%
 Russian 20%
 Belarusian 60%

References

Notes

Villages in Horlivka Raion